Dyschirius kabakovi is a species of ground beetle in the subfamily Scaritinae. It was described by Fedorenko in 1996.

References

kabakovi
Beetles described in 1996